PONY Baseball and Softball is a non-profit organization with headquarters in Washington, Pennsylvania. Started in 1951, PONY organizes youth baseball and softball leagues and tournaments, as over 500,000 players annually play PONY in over 4,000 leagues throughout the United States and over 40 countries world-wide. The televised Pony League World Series held annually in August at Washington's Lew Hays Pony Field attracts teenage teams from around the world. Membership is open to children and young adults from age 4 to 23 and the leagues are organized in two-year age brackets with "and-under" programs. Hundreds of PONY players have gone on to Major League Baseball careers, including Hall of Fame inductees Tony Gwynn and Cal Ripken Jr.

Origin of name
Children at the Washington, Pennsylvania, YMCA named the organization PONY, which stood for "Protect Our Neighborhood Youth."  This later became "Protect Our Nation's Youth."

Levels of play

Distances shown are for baseball with players pitching; distances for other offerings (such as baseball with machine pitching, fast pitch softball, and slow pitch softball) may vary.

Pony League World Series

The Pony League World Series is the flagship tournament of PONY Baseball and Softball. After the creation of the organization in 1951, there were already 505 teams across 106 leagues the following year. This prompted PONY to create the Pony League World Series in Washington County, Pennsylvania, which has hosted a majority of the tournaments since the inaugural edition in 1952.

From 1964 through 1983, the tournament did not have a set location and sometimes took place in other states: California (1964–1965, 1978), Iowa (1979–1980), Illinois (1967, 1974–1975), Nebraska (1966), Texas (1977), and Washington (1983). In 1981, World Series Tournaments, Incorporated (WSTI) was put in charge of running the tournament, and every tournament since 1984 has been played in Washington County, although no team from Pennsylvania has won the tournament since 1955.

The first team from outside the United States to play in the tournament was Monterrey, Mexico, in 1959—Monterrey had won the Little League World Series in 1957 and 1958. In 1968, international slots were added to the tournament, with teams from Canada and Venezuela participating. The first participant from Puerto Rico was a team from Cataño in 1971. The first non-US champion was a team from Monterrey in 1972. A team from Japan was the first non-Americas participant, in 1986. The first non-Americas champion was a team from Seoul, South Korea, in 1988.

The format of the tournament has differed; for most years it has been double-elimination, while at least the first tournament was single-elimination, and the finals were a best of three at least twice during the 1970s. Most editions of the tournament have been contested with a field of eight teams, but field size has been as small as four and as large as 10:

The tournament is currently sponsored by Dick's Sporting Goods and the games are streamed on MLB.com, the official site of Major League Baseball. The recent finals can also be found on YouTube.

After the 2020 edition was canceled due to the COVID-19 pandemic, the 2021 edition was staged with only US-based teams (including a team from Puerto Rico).

Champions

Source:

Note: in cases of conflicting records, contemporary news reports have been given priority.

Championship totals

By U.S. state or non-U.S. country. Updated through the 2022 championship (70 playings, 140 total appearances).

Gallery

See also
Amateur baseball in the United States
Baseball awards#PONY Baseball

Notes

References

External links

Pony League World Series

Children's sport
Softball organizations
Softball in the United States
Baseball organizations
Youth baseball in the United States
Youth baseball
Baseball in Pennsylvania
Youth organizations based in Pennsylvania
Washington County, Pennsylvania
Sports organizations established in 1951
1951 establishments in Pennsylvania